Mary Anderson (later Mary Anderson de Navarro; July 28, 1859 – May 29, 1940) was an American theatre actress.

Early life
Mary Antoinette Anderson was the daughter of Charles Henry Anderson, an Oxford-educated New Yorker, and his wife, Antonia Leugers; the latter had been disowned by her Philadelphia Catholic family after the couple had eloped to California.

Mary was born in Sacramento, California. Shortly after her birth, her parents moved to Louisville, Kentucky, where her father enlisted in the Confederate States Army in the American Civil War. He was killed in action at Mobile when she was three.

Mary was educated at the Ursuline convent and the all-girl Presentation Academy in Louisville. She was an unenthusiastic pupil except for an interest in reading and acting Shakespeare. She also took private lessons in music, dancing and literature. Encouraged by her stepfather, Dr Hamilton Griffin, at 14 she was sent to New York for ten lessons with the actor George Vandenhoff, her only professional training.

Stage career
In 1875, she made her first stage appearance at a benefit performance at Macauley's Theatre in Louisville, Kentucky, in the role of Shakespeare's Juliet The manager, Barney Macauley, was sufficiently impressed to extend the booking to a week as Juliet and further roles including Julia in Sheridan Knowles's The Hunchback, Bianca in Henry Hart Milman's Fazio, and R. L. Sheil's Evadne.

Further engagements at St Louis, New Orleans and John McCullough's theatre in San Francisco led to a contract with John T. Ford. Starting as Lady Macbeth in his Washington theatre in 1877, she began an extensive US tour, culminating with a six-week engagement in Edward Bulwer Lytton's The Lady of Lyons at the 5th Avenue Theatre, New York. Critical review was mixed, but she was immediately popular with the public as "Our Mary."

From this point she enjoyed a twelve-year career of unbroken success, with regular New York performances and US tours. In 1879 she went on a voyage to Europe, meeting Sarah Bernhardt and Adelaide Ristori.

In 1883, after starring in an American production of W. S. Gilbert's Pygmalion and Galatea, she went on the London stage at the Lyceum Theatre, remaining in England for six years to perform to much acclaim including at the Shakespeare Memorial Theatre in Stratford-on-Avon. Her first season there, she starred in Gilbert's Comedy and Tragedy as well as in Romeo and Juliet in 1884.

In 1887 in London she appeared in The Winter's Tale in the double role of Perdita and Hermione (the first actress to include this innovation). This production ran to 160 performances, and was taken back to the United States. She invited writer William Black to appear in the production, but, even in a non-speaking role, he froze up and interrupted the performance. In 1889, however, she collapsed on stage due to severe nervous exhaustion during a performance at Albaugh's Theatre in Washington. Disbanding her company, she announced her retirement at the age of 30. Some commentators, particularly in the British press, ascribed this turn of events to hostile press reviews on her return to the U.S. The author Willa Cather went further and blamed a specifically hurtful review from a close friend.

Performances

Later life
Ordered to rest after her breakdown, Mary Anderson visited England. In 1890 she married Antonio Fernando de Navarro (1860–1932), an American sportsman and barrister of Basque extraction, . She became known as Mary Anderson de Navarro. They settled at Court Farm in the Cotswolds, Broadway, Worcestershire, where she cultivated an interest in music and became a noted hostess with a distinguished circle of musical, literary and ecclesiastical guests. She also gave birth to three children, one son who died at birth, another son, Alma Jose "Toty" Maria de Navarro (1896–1979) and a daughter, Mary Elena de Navarro.

A devout Roman Catholic,  she had a chapel built in her attic, with stained-glass windows designed by Paul Woodroffe. She has been cited as a model for characters in the Mapp and Lucia novels of E F Benson, either the operatic soprano Olga Bracely  or Lucia herself, as well as the prototype for the heroine of William Black's novel The Strange Adventures of a House-Boat.

She resisted encouragements to return to the theatre, but did a number of  fund-raising performances during World War I in Worcester, Stratford and London. The latter included roles as Galatea, Juliet and Clarice in W. S. Gilbert's play Comedy and Tragedy. She published two books of her memories, the 1896 A Few Memories and the 1936 A Few More Memories, and collaborated with Robert Smythe Hichens on a 1911 New York stage adaptation of his novel, The Garden of Allah.

Death
She died at her home in Broadway, Worcestershire, in 1940, aged 80. She was survived by her son and daughter.

Legacy
The Mary Anderson Theatre was the oldest theatre on Louisville’s 4th Street. It opened in 1907 as a vaudeville house, but two years later began to screen movies. The theatre closed in 1972 and was converted into office space.

Land donated by Anderson in Mount St. Francis, Indiana to the Conventual Franciscan Friars is now the Mount Saint Francis Center for Spirituality. The center serves as the headquarters for the Province of Our Lady of Consolation and home to the Mary Anderson Center, an artist colony.  In 1989, the portion of US Route 150 that adjoins the donated property was named the Mary Anderson Memorial Highway. A figure based on Anderson appeared on the Louisville Clock.

The house and farm that Mary and Antonio Navarro purchased and extended in the town of Broadway, Court Farm, is recognised as hosting one of the best preserved Edwardian gardens. It was left to her son, Toty de Navarro, who lived there with his wife, Dorothy, their son Michael and Dorothy's long-time Cambridge friend, Gertrude Caton Thompson. As in the years when Mary lived there, it was often filled with visiting artists and musicians, including Myra Hess and a young Jacqueline du Pré.

References and sources
References

Sources
 Donald Roy, "Anderson, Mary (1859–1940)", Oxford Dictionary of National Biography, Oxford University Press, 2004
 Winter Stage Life of Mary Anderson (1886)

External links

 
 Mary Anderson  by J. M. Farrar (1885), a Project Gutenberg etext
 "Perdita", a poem by Florence Earle Coates "on seeing Miss Anderson in the role"
 Oxford Dictionary of National Biography
 Letters from Mary Anderson, 1910–1940, held by the Billy Rose Theatre Division, New York Public Library for the Performing Arts
Heroines of the Modern Stage p. 230 by Forrest Izard c.1915

1859 births
1940 deaths
People associated with Gilbert and Sullivan
Actresses from Sacramento, California
Actresses from Louisville, Kentucky
Catholics from Kentucky
People from Wychavon (district)
19th-century American actresses
American stage actresses
20th-century American actresses
American silent film actresses